Trois milliards sans ascenseur (Translation: Three Billions Without an Elevator) (/ Seven Brains for a Perfect Shot) is a 1972 French-Italian  film, directed by Roger Pigaut. It stars actor Gabriele Ferzetti. The script was co-written by Lucio Fulci.

Plot 
A group of likeable slackers with little talent attempts to steal a prestigious jewellery collection exhibited at the highest floor of a tower. What they lack in experience, they make up for with street smarts. They think the stakes are too high for them, so they subcontract the heist, but swindle the subcontractor. They try to blackmail the exhibition's insurance agency, but end up tricked.

Cast 
 Michel Bouquet as Albert
 Serge Reggiani as Pierrot 
 Marcel Bozzuffi as Gus
 Dany Carrel as Lulu
 Victor Lanoux as Gino
 Gabriele Ferzetti as Raphaël
 Françoise Rosay as Mme Dubreuil
 Bernard Fresson as Julien
 Amidou as José
 Nike Arrighi as Minouche 
 Pierre Rousseau

References

External links

1972 films
1970s French-language films
French heist films
Italian heist films
1970s heist films
1970s French films
1970s Italian films